During the 1997–98 English football season, Crewe Alexandra F.C. competed in the Football League First Division, in their 75th season in the English Football League.

Season summary
In the 1997–98 season, Crewe were favourites to go straight back down to the Second Division and before Christmas, they were in the relegation zone and looked as though it would be a possibility but a fantastic run of 7 wins from 10 league games from January to the end of February, dramatically rose Crewe from a possible relegation to 12th and 7 points from the play-offs but it proved too much to ask for and Crewe finished a satisfying season in 11th place.

Final league table

Results
Crewe Alexandra's score comes first

Legend

Football League First Division

FA Cup

League Cup

Squad

References

Crewe Alexandra F.C. seasons
Crewe Alexandra